Monument Hills is a census-designated place in Yolo County, California. Monument Hills sits at an elevation of 135 feet (41 m). The 2010 United States census reported Monument Hills's population was 1,542.

Geography
According to the United States Census Bureau, the CDP covers an area of 4.0 square miles (10.4 km), all of it land.

Demographics
At the 2010 census Monument Hills had a population of 1,542. The racial makeup of Monument Hills was 1,163 (75.4%) White, 20 (1.3%) African American, 32 (2.1%) Native American, 77 (5.0%) Asian, 17 (1.1%) Pacific Islander, 153 (9.9%) from other races, and 80 (5.2%) from two or more races. Hispanic or Latino of any race were 403 people (26.1%).

The whole population lived in households, no one lived in non-institutionalized group quarters and no one was institutionalized.

There were 526 households, 196 (37.3%) had children under the age of 18 living in them, 383 (72.8%) were opposite-sex married couples living together, 30 (5.7%) had a female householder with no husband present, 19 (3.6%) had a male householder with no wife present.  There were 23 (4.4%) unmarried opposite-sex partnerships, and 8 (1.5%) same-sex married couples or partnerships. 70 households (13.3%) were one person and 22 (4.2%) had someone living alone who was 65 or older. The average household size was 2.93.  There were 432 families (82.1% of households); the average family size was 3.22.

The age distribution was 379 people (24.6%) under the age of 18, 109 people (7.1%) aged 18 to 24, 345 people (22.4%) aged 25 to 44, 552 people (35.8%) aged 45 to 64, and 157 people (10.2%) who were 65 or older.  The median age was 42.9 years. For every 100 females, there were 107.3 males.  For every 100 females age 18 and over, there were 107.3 males.

There were 575 housing units at an average density of 142.8 per square mile, of the occupied units 451 (85.7%) were owner-occupied and 75 (14.3%) were rented. The homeowner vacancy rate was 3.0%; the rental vacancy rate was 10.7%.  1,302 people (84.4% of the population) lived in owner-occupied housing units and 240 people (15.6%) lived in rental housing units.

References

External links

Census-designated places in Yolo County, California
Census-designated places in California